An outdoor bust of José Martí by Cuban artist Tony Lopez is installed at Hermann Park's McGovern Centennial Gardens in Houston, Texas, United States. The bust was acquired by the City of Houston in 1981.

See also
 List of public art in Houston

References

Busts in Texas
Hermann Park
Monuments and memorials in Texas
Outdoor sculptures in Houston
Sculptures of men in Texas